Adriaan Jozef Kea (January 19, 1948 – August 31, 1999) was a Dutch-born Canadian ice hockey defenceman. He played in the National Hockey League with the Atlanta Flames and St. Louis Blues from 1974 to 1983.

Playing career

Born in Weesp, North Holland, Netherlands, but raised in Collingwood, Ontario (his family moved to Canada when he was four years old), Kea started his National Hockey League career with the Atlanta Flames. He also played with the St. Louis Blues. His career lasted from 1974 to 1983. Kea was the father of stand-up comedian Gabe Kea from Cincinnati, and uncle of Jeff Beukeboom and Joe Nieuwendyk.

Injury and retirement

Kea was playing for the Salt Lake Golden Eagles, the Blues' Central Hockey League affiliate in Salt Lake City in 1983 when he suffered severe head trauma as he fell and hit his head on the ice during a game. The injury left him physically and mentally disabled. Because he was playing in a minor league game, NHL benefits for catastrophic injuries did not apply to his case, and he and his family struggled financially for several years because he was unable to hold a job.

Post-playing career and death

On September 1, 1999, Kea accidentally drowned at his family's summer home in Six Mile Lake, Ontario. He was 51. In 2012, Dave Bidini claimed in an opinion article for the National Post that Kea committed suicide due to undiagnosed injuries and concussions from his playing career.

Career statistics

Regular season and playoffs

References

External links

 NYT

1948 births
1999 deaths
Accidental deaths in Ontario
Atlanta Flames players
Deaths by drowning in Canada
Dutch emigrants to Canada
Dutch ice hockey defencemen
Ice hockey people from Simcoe County
Omaha Knights (CHL) players
Salt Lake Golden Eagles (CHL) players
Sportspeople from Collingwood, Ontario
St. Louis Blues players
Suncoast Suns (EHL) players
Tulsa Oilers (1964–1984) players